Sarah Paige Aarons (born 4 October 1994, previously known as Paige IV and sometimes simply as Sarah) is a songwriter from Bentleigh, Melbourne, Australia. Now based in Los Angeles, Aarons is signed to Sony ATV Publishing. She co-wrote "Stay" by Zedd and Alessia Cara and "The Middle" by Zedd, Maren Morris and Grey, which both went to #1 on Mainstream Top 40 and were each certified double platinum in the US. In 2019, Aarons was nominated for Song of the Year at the 61st Annual Grammy Awards for her work on "The Middle".

In Australia, Aarons had acclaimed success with the breakout song "Keeping Score" by LDRU, "Frozen" by Pon Cho and Cosmo's Midnight's "History," which in turn has become the most played song on Triple J in 2017. She has also received three ARIA Awards for her work with LDRU and has gone double platinum in Australia.
 
In 2017, Aarons was appointed one of APRA AMCOS Ambassadors and was included in LA Weeklys 20 hottest current songwriters. At the APRA Music Awards of 2018 she won Breakthrough Songwriter of the Year, she was also nominated for Country Work of the Year for the track, "House", alongside co-writers Brooke McClymont, Mollie McClymont, Samantha McClymont and Michael Fatkin.

At the 2019 APRA Awards, Aarons won Songwriter of the Year as well as Most Played Australian Work, Rock Work of the Year and Dance Work of the Year.

In 2018, Aarons had her right leg amputated due to severe rheumatoid arthritis, an autoimmune condition that causes pain and swelling of the joints.

Selected discography
 indicates a background vocal contribution.

 indicates an un-credited lead vocal contribution.

 indicates a credited vocal/featured artist contribution.

Awards and nominations

References 

1994 births
Living people
APRA Award winners
Australian songwriters
Musicians from Melbourne
Women songwriters
21st-century Australian musicians
21st-century women musicians
Australian amputees
Amputee musicians
People from Bentleigh, Victoria
Australian expatriates in the United States